The 1949–50 Football League season was Birmingham City Football Club's 47th in the Football League and their 28th in the First Division. They were bottom of the 22-team division by the end of August, a position which they retained for all but three weeks of the season, so were relegated to the Second Division for 1950–51. They entered the 1949–50 FA Cup at the third round proper and lost in that round to Swansea Town.

Twenty-nine players made at least one appearance in nationally organised competition, and there were nine different goalscorers. Goalkeeper Gil Merrick was ever-present in the 43-game season, and Jimmy Dailey was leading goalscorer with only nine goals, all scored in the league.

Football League First Division

League table (part)

FA Cup

Appearances and goals

Players with name struck through and marked  left the club during the playing season.

See also
Birmingham City F.C. seasons

References
General
 
 
 Source for match dates and results: 
 Source for lineups, appearances, goalscorers and attendances: Matthews (2010), Complete Record, pp. 334–35.
 Source for kit: "Birmingham City". Historical Football Kits. Retrieved 22 May 2018.

Specific

Birmingham City F.C. seasons
Birmingham City